Gideon Mensah is the name of:

Gideon Mensah (footballer, born 1998), Ghanaian footballer
Gideon Mensah (footballer, born 2000), Ghanaian footballer